Dominik Óscar Gutiérrez (born April 5, 1997) is an American professional wrestler. He is currently signed to WWE, where he performs on the Raw brand under the ring name Dominik Mysterio as a member of The Judgment Day. He is a one-time former SmackDown Tag Team Champion with his father Rey Mysterio, in which they were the first real-life father and son team to win a tag team championship in WWE.

Early life 
Dominik Gutiérrez was born on April 5, 1997. Of Mexican American heritage he is the son of Angie and Óscar Gutiérrez, better known as Rey Mysterio. He has a younger sister, Aalyah Gutiérrez.

Professional wrestling career

World Wrestling Entertainment/WWE

Early appearances (2003–2019) 
Before he became a pro wrestler, Gutiérrez went to WWE events to see his father on several occasions. He was in the audience on the June 5, 2003, edition of SmackDown! in Anaheim, California where his father won the WWE Cruiserweight Championship from Matt Hardy. He celebrated with his father in the ring as SmackDown! went off the air. He had his first storyline in the summer of 2005 as part of a storyline between his father and Eddie Guerrero, in which the two rivals fought for custody of him. During the storyline, Guerrero stated that he was Dominik's biological father. On August 21, Mysterio defeated Guerrero in a ladder match for custody of Dominik at SummerSlam. He made two more appearances in 2006, first at WrestleMania 22 with Angie and Aalyah watching his father win the World Heavyweight Championship for the first time and second on the September 15 edition of SmackDown! where he watched backstage as his father battled with Mr. Kennedy. He once again appeared on the March 12, 2010, episode of SmackDown, this time during the feud between Rey Mysterio and the Straight Edge Society (CM Punk, Luke Gallows, and Serena).

In 2018, Gutiérrez began training with Jay Lethal and his father to become a professional wrestler. On the March 19, 2019, episode of SmackDown Live, Dominik appeared on the show with his father, Rey Mysterio, who announced that he would be facing Samoa Joe for the WWE United States Championship at WrestleMania 35 on April 7. He once again appeared on Raw from April to June, during the feud between Mysterio and Joe. During the following months, he was involved in his father's storylines and matches, including interfering in Rey's WWE Championship match against Brock Lesnar at Survivor Series on November 24.

The Mysterios (2020–2022) 

In May 2020, Rey and Dominik feuded with Seth Rollins and Murphy, leading to Dominik's first match at SummerSlam on August 23, where he lost to Rollins in a Street Fight. At Payback on August 30, Dominik and Rey defeated Rollins and Murphy, earning his first victory in WWE. On the following episode of Raw, Dominik lost to Rollins in a qualifier for the triple threat match for the WWE Championship at Clash of Champions.

As part of the 2020 Draft in October, Mysterio was drafted to the SmackDown brand. At Survivor Series on November 22, Dominik failed to win a dual brand battle royal. At the Royal Rumble on January 31, 2021, he entered his first Royal Rumble match at #21, eliminating King Corbin but was eliminated by Bobby Lashley. Dominik then began teaming with Rey, and on the WrestleMania edition of SmackDown on April 9, they faced The Street Profits, Otis and Chad Gable, and the champions Dolph Ziggler and Robert Roode for the SmackDown Tag Team Championship in a losing effort as the champions retained. At WrestleMania Backlash on May 16, they won the titles from Ziggler and Roode, marking Dominik's first championship in WWE and making him and Rey the first father and son tag team champions in WWE history. At Money in the Bank on July 18, The Mysterios lost the titles to The Usos, ending their reign at 63 days. A rematch for the titles was set for SummerSlam on August 21, which the Mysterios failed to win.

As part of the 2021 Draft, Rey and Dominik were drafted to the Raw brand. On the October 25 episode of Raw, Mysterio lost to Austin Theory. The following week on the November 1 episode of Raw, his father Rey lost to Theory by disqualification, after he slapped Theory in the face, before the referee Rod Zapata caught him and calling the bell. At the Royal Rumble on January 29, 2022, Dominik entered at #14, but was quickly eliminated by Happy Corbin. On the February 21 episode of Raw, The Miz challenged The Mysterios to a tag team match at WrestleMania 38 with social media personality Logan Paul as his partner, which they accepted. On the first night of the event on April 2, Dominik and Rey lost to Miz and Paul. On the June 27 episode of Raw, The Mysterios competed in a Money in the Bank qualifying battle royal, which was won by Riddle.

The Judgment Day (2022–present)

In the summer of 2022, The Mysterios began feuding with The Judgment Day (Finn Bálor, Damian Priest and Rhea Ripley) over their attempts to recruit Dominik into the group and betray his father. At SummerSlam on July 30, The Mysterios defeated Bálor and Priest following interference from the returning Edge, The Judgment Day's former leader. After losing an Undisputed WWE Tag Team Championship match on the following episode of Raw, The Judgment Day attacked the Mysterios before Edge came out to save them, but accidentally speared Dominik. The following week, Dominik confronted Edge backstage and shoved him. Later that night, Ripley walked out on the stage in the middle of his father's match against Bálor, laying down a bloodied and bruised Dominik, distracting Rey long enough for Bálor to get the victory.

Dominik accompanied Edge and Rey for their match against The Judgment Day at Clash at the Castle on September 3, which Edge and Rey won. After the match, Dominik viciously hit Edge with a low blow. While Rey was begging for him to stop, before Dominik hit his father with a clothesline, and turning heel for the first time in his career. On the following episode of Raw, Dominik officially joined The Judgment Day, helping the group attack Edge and Rey. On the September 12 episode of Raw, Dominik lost to Edge by disqualification after Bálor attacked Edge with a steel chair. On the October 17 episode of Raw, Dominik scored his biggest singles match win by pinning AJ Styles after interference from Ripley. At Crown Jewel on November 5, Dominik, Bálor, and Priest defeated The O.C. (AJ Styles, Luke Gallows and Karl Anderson) in a six-man tag team match after interference from Ripley. On the November 28 episode of Raw, The Judgment Day defeated The O.C in an eight-person mixed tag team match to end their feud.

On Thanksgiving, Dominik invited Ripley to the Mysterio family home. After Rey refused to let them into the house, Dominik and Ripley attacked Rey. On Christmas Eve, Dominik and Ripley visited Dominik's grandparents' home. A confrontation ensued between Dominik, Ripley, Rey and Angie (Rey's wife and Dominik's mother) outside of the house with Dominik shoving Rey and Angie slapping Ripley. The police arrived shortly after and (kayfabe) arrested Dominik. After being released from police custody, Dominik took on a new gimmick of being a former convict who "had served time in prison with the world's most dangerous people" but in reality, he was only in county jail for a few hours.

On the January 9, 2023, episode of Raw, Dominik, Bálor and Priest won a Raw Tag Team Championship opportunity against The Usos by winning a tag team turmoil match. At Raw is XXX on January 23, The Usos successfully defended the championship against Dominik and Priest despite Jimmy Uso's injury, with Sami Zayn taking Jimmy's place. At the Royal Rumble on January 28, Dominik and/or The Judgment Day presumably took out his father who was scheduled to enter at #17. Dominik entered at #18 while wearing his father's mask but was eliminated by the eventual winner Cody Rhodes. On Valentine's Day, Dominik and Ripley intruded on Rey's and Angie's Valentine's Day dinner where the latter party immediately gave way to the former. At the end of the dinner, Dominik fled the restaurant thinking there was a sting operation on him as "[he was] the most wanted man on TikTok" after two police officers entered the premise. Ripley was left to pick up the bill before leaving. 

On the March 10 episode of SmackDown, Dominik and The Judgment Day interrupted Rey as Rey was about to address being the first inductee to the WWE Hall of Fame Class of 2023. After The Judgment Day defeated Legado Del Fantasma (who were a heel group and had recently turned face for siding with Rey) in a six-man tag team match, Dominik taunted and goaded Rey into hitting him, saying that Rey was a "deadbeat dad" and that "[Dominik] should have been Eddie's son." On the following episode of Raw, Dominik interrupted Rey again and challenged Rey to a match at WrestleMania 39. Rey declined, saying he would never fight his own son.

Professional wrestling style and persona
After Gutierrez joined the Judgment Day stable, his character was compared to Eddie Guerrero. When he is portrayed as a former convict, his gimmick is also similar to his godfather Konnan.

Personal life
Gutiérrez has been in a relationship with Marie Juliette since November 8, 2011. On January 2, 2023, Gutiérrez got engaged to Juliette.

Championships and accomplishments
Pro Wrestling Illustrated
 Rookie of the Year (2020)
 Ranked No. 147 of the top 500 singles wrestlers in the PWI 500 in 2021
WWE
WWE SmackDown Tag Team Championship (1 time) – with Rey Mysterio 
Other titles
National Don't H8 Ringmaster (2020)

References

External links 

 
 
 
 

1997 births
American male professional wrestlers
American professional wrestlers of Mexican descent
Living people
People from San Diego
Professional wrestlers from California
21st-century professional wrestlers